Juan Nicolás Caviglia (28 November 1929 – 17 January 2022) was an Argentine gymnast. He competed at the 1952 Summer Olympics and the 1960 Summer Olympics. Caviglia died on 17 January 2022, at the age of 92.

References

External links
 

1929 births
2022 deaths
Argentine male artistic gymnasts
Olympic gymnasts of Argentina
Gymnasts at the 1952 Summer Olympics
Gymnasts at the 1960 Summer Olympics
Sportspeople from Córdoba, Argentina
Pan American Games medalists in gymnastics
Pan American Games gold medalists for Argentina
Pan American Games silver medalists for Argentina
Pan American Games bronze medalists for Argentina
Gymnasts at the 1951 Pan American Games
Gymnasts at the 1955 Pan American Games
Gymnasts at the 1959 Pan American Games
Medalists at the 1951 Pan American Games
Medalists at the 1955 Pan American Games
Medalists at the 1959 Pan American Games